By Order of Pompadour is a 1924 German silent historical film directed by Frederic Zelnik and starring Alwin Neuß, Lya Mara, and Frida Richard.

The film's sets were designed by the art director Willi Herrmann.

Cast

References

External links

Films of the Weimar Republic
Films directed by Frederic Zelnik
German silent feature films
Films set in the 18th century
Films set in Paris
German historical films
1920s historical films
Cultural depictions of Louis XV
Cultural depictions of Madame de Pompadour
German black-and-white films
Phoebus Film films
1920s German films